Efficient Java Matrix Library (EJML) is a linear algebra library for manipulating real/complex/dense/sparse matrices. Its design goals are; 1) to be as computationally and memory efficient as possible for both small and large matrices, and 2) to be accessible to both novices and experts. These goals are accomplished by dynamically selecting the best algorithms to use at runtime, clean API, and multiple interfaces. EJML is free, written in 100% Java and has been released under an Apache v2.0 license.

EJML has three distinct ways to interact with it: 1) Procedural, 2) SimpleMatrix, and 3) Equations. The procedural style provides all capabilities of EJML and almost complete control over matrix creation, speed, and specific algorithms. The SimpleMatrix style provides a simplified subset of the core capabilities in an easy to use flow-styled object-oriented API, inspired by JAMA. The Equations style provides a symbolic interface, similar in spirit to Matlab and other CAS, that provides a compact way of writing equations.

Capabilities 

EJML provides the following capabilities for dense matrices.

 Basic Operators (addition, multiplication, ... )
 Matrix Manipulation (extract, insert, combine, ... )
 Linear Solvers (linear, least squares, incremental, ... )
 Decompositions (LU, QR, Cholesky, SVD, Eigenvalue, ...)
 Matrix Features (rank, symmetric, definitiveness, ... )
 Random Matrices (covariance, orthogonal, symmetric, ... )
 Different Internal Formats (row-major, block)
 Unit Testing

Usage examples

Equation style 

Computing the Kalman gain:

eq.process("K = P*H'*inv( H*P*H' + R )");

Procedural style 

Computing Kalman gain:

mult(H, P, c);
multTransB(c, H, S);
addEquals(S, R);
if (!invert(S, S_inv))
    throw new RuntimeException("Invert failed");
multTransA(H, S_inv, d);
mult(P, d, K);

SimpleMatrix style 

Example of singular value decomposition (SVD):
SimpleSVD s = matA.svd();
SimpleMatrix U = s.getU();
SimpleMatrix W = s.getW();
SimpleMatrix V = s.getV();

Example of matrix multiplication:
SimpleMatrix result = matA.mult(matB);

DecompositionFactory  

Use of a DecompositionFactory to compute a Singular Value Decomposition with a Dense Double Row Major matrix (DDRM):

SingularValueDecomposition_F64<DenseMatrix64F> svd = 
    DecompositionFactory_DDRM.svd(true, true, true);

if (!DecompositionFactory.decomposeSafe(svd, matA))
    throw new DetectedException("Decomposition failed.");

DenseMatrix64F U = svd.getU(null, false);
DenseMatrix64F S = svd.getW(null);
DenseMatrix64F V = svd.getV(null, false);

Example of matrix multiplication:
CommonOps_DDRM.mult(matA, matB, result);

See also
 List of numerical libraries

References

External links 
 Efficient Java Matrix Library (EJML) homepage

Numerical libraries